Shahab Lilam (also Romanized as Shahāb Līlam) is a village in Mazkureh Rural District, in the Central District of Sari County, Mazandaran Province, Iran. At the 2006 census, its population was 607, in 160 families.

References 

Populated places in Sari County